Latha, commonly known as Latha Hamsalekha, is an Indian playback singer in Kannada. She is the wife of composer Hamsalekha. For her song Aa Arunodaya Chanda in the movie Arunodaya, Latha was awarded the Karnataka State Film Award for Best Female Playback Singer in 1999–2000. She has sung over 200 songs in Kannada. The following is a complete list of her songs:

Kannada

References

Hamsalekha, Latha